Belmont Mansion, also known as Acklen Hall, and originally known as Belle Monte, Belle Mont or Belmont, is a historic mansion located in Nashville, Tennessee. It was built by Joseph and Adelicia Acklen to serve as the center of their 180-acre summer estate in what was then country outside the city, and featured elaborate gardens and a zoo. They lived much of the rest of the year on her plantations in Louisiana.

The estate was sold in the late 19th century and since 1890 has been used for educational functions. It was first used as a girls academy, then as the first building of what became Belmont College and now Belmont University. Today it is operated as a museum. It was listed on the National Register of Historic Places in 1971.

History
In 1849, after the death of her husband, the infamous slave trader Isaac Franklin who bequeathed his slave-trading fortune to her, the extremely wealthy widow Adelicia (Hayes) Franklin married Joseph Alexander Smith Acklen, a young attorney from Alabama. It was completed by 1853 as an Italian villa-style summer home. Adelicia and Joseph used Belmont as a summer home. They lived the rest of the year on one of her seven Louisiana cotton slave plantations, which totaled .

The estate contained a variety of buildings, with the house situated at the top of the hill. Covered balconies with cast iron railing and trim surrounded the house to protect windows from the sun. Atop the house, a ten-foot octagonal cupola vented the house during the summer months. It was also used as an "astronomical observatory" used for viewing the stars, the estate and downtown Nashville.

Beside the house, there was a T-shaped guest house and art gallery. The south wing of the guest house contained guestrooms and a bowling alley. The art gallery had a corrugated glass roof and comprised the north wing.

The grounds included lavish gardens, conservatories, aviary, lake and a zoo. The conservatories housed tropical fruit and flowers, along with camellia japonica, jasmine, lilies, and cacti. The zoo featured bears, monkeys, peacocks, singing birds, a white owl, alligators from Louisiana, and a deer park.

Joseph and Adelicia had six children together, but their twins died of scarlet fever at the age of 2 in 1855. In 1863, Joseph died in Louisiana, where he was supervising their plantations during the Civil War. Adelicia secretly negotiated agreements with both Union and Confederate authorities to allow 2,800 bales of her cotton to be shipped to Liverpool, England, and sold for a total of $758,000.

Despite a two-week occupation by Union General Thomas J. Wood prior to the Battle of Nashville, Belmont Mansion and its contents went undamaged during the Civil War. Only the grounds, where 13,000 Union troops spent those first two weeks of December 1864, suffered damage.

Immediately following the war, Adelicia and her four surviving children traveled to Europe. While there, she continued amassing her large art collection, including five major marble statues by the most important American sculptors who were working in Rome. These included works by Randolph Rogers, William Henry Rinehart, Joseph Mozier, and Chauncey Ives. Four of these pieces remain in the mansion today. In France, Adelicia was presented at the Court of Emperor Louis Napoleon and his wife Empress Eugénie.

Months before her death, Adelicia sold Belmont and the surrounding land to Lewis T. Baxter for around $54,000. It was adapted and in 1890 opened as a women's academy and junior college. The school merged with Ward's Seminary in 1913 and was renamed Ward-Belmont. The Tennessee Baptist Convention purchased the school in 1951, and developed a four-year, coeducational college, Belmont College.

It was developed as a university offering graduate programs and, in 2007, Belmont University separated from the Tennessee Baptist Convention. Today the mansion is owned by the Belmont Mansion Association and Belmont University. It is operated and preserved by the Belmont Mansion Association.

Gilt frame mirrors hang over marble mantels, reflecting the elaborate gasoliers and elegantly furnished parlors. Much of the original Venetian glass still adorns the windows, doors, and transoms of Belmont. The Grand Salon is considered by architectural historians to be the most elaborate domestic interior built in antebellum Tennessee. Now maintained as part of the university campus, the gardens contain five cast iron gazebos. The  water tower remains on the grounds and today serves as a Bell Tower for Belmont University.

Many notable visitors to the home include Mrs. James K. Polk, William Walker, Agustín de Iturbide, Dwight L. Moody, Thomas Huxley, and Octavia Walton Le Vert.

The Belmont Mansion was listed on the National Register of Historic Places in 1971.

References

Further reading
 Wardin, Dr. Albert W., Belmont Mansion: The Home of Joseph and Adelicia Acklen, (Nashville: Belmont Mansion Association), 2005.

External links
 Belmont Mansion website
 

Houses completed in 1853
Belmont University
Landmarks in Tennessee
Museums in Davidson County, Tennessee
Tennessee in the American Civil War
Houses on the National Register of Historic Places in Tennessee
Plantation houses in Tennessee
Historic house museums in Tennessee
University museums in Tennessee
Houses in Davidson County, Tennessee
National Register of Historic Places in Nashville, Tennessee